Shea Emmanuel Charles (born 5 November 2003) is a professional footballer who plays as a midfielder for Premier League side Manchester City and the Northern Ireland national team.

Early life 
Shea Charles was born in Manchester, where he started playing football, joining the Sky Blues' academy as a 7 years old. He is of Northern Irish descent through his mother.

Club career

Manchester City
Progressing through the Citizens youth teams, he became a key player of the under-23 squad during the 2021–22 season, winning the Premier League 2, whilst still playing with the under-18, as they also won the national competition. During that season, the young player was also first called by Pep Guardiola to train with the Premier League squad.

On 22 February 2023, Charles was named as a substitute for City's UEFA Champions League last-16 tie away at RB Leipzig.

International career 
Shea Charles was capped by Northern Ireland from the U16 to the U21: playing two games with the under-16, he later became a key player with the under-19—after the covid pandemic had halted junior competitions for most of 2020 and 2021—, winning two friendlies against Faroe Islands in 2021, before playing the Euro qualifiers. With the under-21, he played two games against Slovakia and France in March 2022.

First called to the senior team by Ian Baraclough in May 2022, Shea Charles made his international debut for Northern Ireland on 2 June 2022, coming on as a substitute for George Saville in the 79th minute of the UEFA Nations League match against Greece. He then made his first start for the Green and White Army three days later, on June 5, in another Nations League match against Cyprus.

Style of play 
Able to play both as a defensive midfielder, a centre-back or a full-back, Charles is described as an athletic and technical player, already showing a great mentality from an early age.

References

External links

Irish Football Association profile

2003 births
Living people
Footballers from Manchester
Association footballers from Northern Ireland
Northern Ireland youth international footballers
Northern Ireland international footballers
English footballers
English people of Northern Ireland descent
Association football midfielders